Joshua Kenneth Heupel (born March 22, 1978) is an American football coach and former player. He is the head football coach at the University of Tennessee. Previously he served as head coach at the University of Central Florida, where he compiled a 28–8 record.

Heupel played college football  as quarterback for the Oklahoma Sooners.  During his college playing career, he was recognized as a consensus All-American, won numerous awards, and led Oklahoma to the 2000 BCS National Championship.  After two years unsuccessfully trying to make an NFL roster (featuring brief stints with the Miami Dolphins and the Green Bay Packers), Heupel became a coach. He served as co-offensive coordinator for Oklahoma until January 6, 2015, when he was let go in a restructuring of the program despite having four successful seasons.  He was named the assistant head coach, offensive coordinator, and quarterbacks coach for the Utah State University Aggies on January 23, 2015. After one season at USU, he was hired on Barry Odom's staff at Missouri, where he was the offensive coordinator before being hired for his first head coaching position at UCF. In December 2017, Heupel was named the UCF head coach. On January 27, 2021, Heupel was named the 27th head coach at Tennessee. Heupel offenses frequently rank in the top five nationally in total offense. In 2022 the Vols led the nation with the #1 offense,  scoring offense, total offense, passing efficiency and total touchdowns.

Early years
Heupel was born and raised in Aberdeen, South Dakota.  His mother, Cindy, was a high school principal, and his father, Ken, was a head football coach at Northern State University.  As a child, Heupel watched game film with his father.

He attended Central High School in Aberdeen, where he played high school football for the Central Golden Eagles. In the second half of the first game of his sophomore season in 1994, he became the Golden Eagles' quarterback in a scaled-down version of the run and shoot offense.  As a senior, he was named South Dakota's player of the year.  He got recruiting inquiries from major college football programs at the universities of Houston, Minnesota, Wisconsin and Wyoming, but "it seemed I was always the second or third guy on their list," according to Heupel.

College career
Heupel began his collegiate playing career at Weber State University in Ogden, Utah. He redshirted in 1996 and saw action in four games as a freshman in 1997, but he suffered an ACL injury during spring practice in 1998, pushing him down the team's depth chart. He transferred to Snow College in Ephraim, Utah, where he beat out Fred Salanoa as the team's starting quarterback. Heupel passed for 2,308 yards and 28 touchdowns, despite sharing playing time with Salanoa. He later held a scholarship offer from Utah State University, but committed to the University of Oklahoma after meeting with Bob Stoops, the new head coach of the Oklahoma Sooners.

Heupel was the Heisman Trophy runner-up in 2000. He was named Big 12 Offensive Player of the Year. He was an All-American, the AP Player of the Year, and a Walter Camp Award winner. Heupel led the Sooners to an undefeated season and a national championship with a 13–2 victory over Florida State in the 2001 Orange Bowl.

Professional career
Heupel was drafted in the sixth round with the 177th overall pick in the 2001 NFL Draft by the Miami Dolphins. Compromised by shoulder tendinitis of his throwing arm, he was relegated to fourth string for the entire preseason and failed to make the team.

He was later signed by the Green Bay Packers in the early 2002 offseason, but was released a month before training camp.

Coaching career

Assistant coaching
Heupel spent the 2004 season as a graduate assistant for Oklahoma under head coach Bob Stoops. In 2005, Heupel was hired as the tight ends coach at the University of Arizona by newly appointed head coach Mike Stoops, Bob's brother and an Oklahoma assistant coach during Heupel's playing days.

Heupel became the quarterbacks coach for Oklahoma in 2006. In that capacity he coached Sooner quarterback Sam Bradford, who won the Heisman Trophy in 2008.  On December 13, 2010, Bob Stoops named Heupel and Jay Norvell as co-offensive coordinators at Oklahoma, replacing Kevin Wilson, who had accepted the head coaching job at Indiana.  Stoops said Heupel would be in charge of calling offensive plays during games. Heupel's contract was not renewed in January 2015 following an 8−5 season capped by a 40−6 loss to Clemson in 2014 Russell Athletic Bowl.

Following his job at Oklahoma, Heupel served as assistant head coach, offensive coordinator and quarterback coach for one season for the Utah State Aggies and as offensive coordinator and quarterback coach for two seasons for the Missouri Tigers.

UCF
Heupel was named head coach of the UCF Knights on December 5, 2017, replacing the departing Scott Frost. In the 2018 season, Heupel led UCF to a 12–1 record and an American Athletic Conference Football Championship Game victory. The Knights appeared in the Fiesta Bowl, where they lost to LSU 40–32.

In the 2019 season, Heupel helped lead the Knights to a 10–3 mark that culminated with a 48–25 victory over Marshall in the Gasparilla Bowl. In the 2020 season, the Knights finished with a 6–4 record in the COVID-19 pandemic shortened season. The Knights appeared in the Boca Raton Bowl and fell 49–23 to BYU.

Tennessee
Heupel was named the 27th head coach at Tennessee on January 27, 2021. In his first season with Tennessee, Heupel led the Volunteers to a Music City Bowl appearance and a final record of 7–6 (4–4 in conference). Heupel won the Steve Spurrier first year head coach award for the second time, sharing the 2021 award with Shane Beamer.

In his second year at Tennessee, Heupel led the Vols to a 8–0 start, their best start since 1998, defeating Pitt for the first time ever (0-3 vs the Panthers prior), breaking a five-game losing streak to their rival Florida, a five-game losing streak to conference foe LSU, and a 15-game losing streak to rival Alabama, launching the Vols back into the top 2 in the AP Poll. On November 1, 2022, Heupel led the Vols to their first #1 ranking since 1998, in the first release of the College Football Playoffs rankings. Heupel capped off the 11–2 season with a 31–14 win over the Clemson Tigers in the Orange Bowl. Tennessee's 11 wins were the most for the program since 2001 and tied for the second-most in school history. He won SEC Coach of the Year for the 2022 season.

On January 24, 2023, ESPN reported that Tennessee had reached a contract extension agreement that will keep Heupel in Knoxville until 2029, with an annual salary of $9 million.

Personal life
Heupel and his wife have a son and a daughter.  His sister is married to former U.S. Representative Dan Boren.

Head coaching record

References

External links

 
 Coaching statistics at Sports-Reference.com
 Tennessee Volunteers bio

1978 births
Living people
American football quarterbacks
Arizona Wildcats football coaches
Barcelona Dragons players
Miami Dolphins players
Missouri Tigers football coaches
Oklahoma Sooners football coaches
Oklahoma Sooners football players
UCF Knights football coaches
Utah State Aggies football coaches
Snow Badgers football players
Tennessee Volunteers football coaches
Weber State Wildcats football players
All-American college football players
People from Aberdeen, South Dakota
Coaches of American football from South Dakota
Players of American football from South Dakota